US Naval Base Carolines was number of United States Navy bases on the Caroline Islands in the western Pacific Ocean, to the north of New Guinea during World War II. The bases were built to support the island hoping Pacific war efforts of the allied nations fighting the Empire of Japan.

History

The Caroline Islands is now the Federated States of Micronesia nation. Micronesia comprises Kosrae State, Pohnpei State, Chuuk State (in past spelled Truk) and Yap State. After the Spanish–American War in 1898, the islands became a German colony and German naval base. At the start of World War I in 1914 British warships destroyed the German colonial plantation owner's radio station. On October 7, 1914, Japan invaded and took over Yap island without a battle. Japan and Britain made a treaty giving Japan the Pacific islands north of the Equator, signed at the Treaty of Versailles in 1919. In the 1930s Japan built naval and airbases on many of the islands.  Truk Lagoon was the largest and strongest of these bases. The United States Army Air Forces bombed the Truk base, but it was bypassed in the amphibious landing war. Japan's Truk base had five airfields, fleet anchorage, a few seaplane bases, torpedo boat bases, repair facilities, and later a radar station.
Japan also built a large base at Ponape, now Pohnpei. By February 1944, the US bombers destroyed Truk and by sea, the US Navy cut had cut off Truk and the 5,000 Japanese troops. The US also bypassed Ponape in the Senyavin Islands and it 8,000 troops. 

The United States Armed Forces built a large base at Ulithi Atoll in the Yap islands, as it had a large fleet anchorage for up to 700 ships.  The US Army 81st Division landed unopposed on Ulithi on September 23, 1944. Soon US Navy Seabees started work building the large base at Ulithi. The US Navy survey ship  found the lagoon was well protected and usable for fleet anchorage. Japan bombed the US base at Ulithi a few times, with only marginal damage. The Fleet Post Office (FPO) for Caroline Islands was # 3249. 

After the war, the Caroline Islands became parts of the Trust Territory of the Pacific Islands administered by the United States. In 1986, the new nation of the Federated States of Micronesia was formed. Independence was proclaimed on May 10, 1979, and Compact of Free Association was established on November 3, 1986.

Major bases
Naval Base Ulithi on Ulithi Atoll, FPO# 3011
Naval Base Peleliu on Palau Islands.
Naval base Angaur Island, on Palau Islands, base to support Angaur Airstrip
 Naval Base at Uman Island, Truk Lagoon, FPO#3048, 4th Fleet anchorage, PT Boat Base.<ref>Uman Island'pacificwrecks.com</ref>
 Naval Base Kossol Roads, FPO#3027, Fleet anchorage a surrendered base, staging area to support operations in the Philippines. Service Squadron was stationed at Kossol Roads as a floating resupply and repair base.

Minor bases
 Naval Base at Puluwat Island, Truk Lagoon, FPO#3044
 Naval Base at Fefan Island, Truk Lagoon, FPO#3045, captured seaport
 Naval Base at Yap Island, FPO#3014, captured base
 Naval Base at Param Island, Truk Lagoon, FPO#3050, post war surrendered Airfield
 Naval Base at Tol Island, Truk, FPO#3105, post war surrendered base
 Naval Base at Sorol Island, FPO#3012, post war surrendered small base
 Naval Base at Namonuito Atoll, FPO#3037
 Naval Base at Minto Reef, FPO#3038
 Naval Base at Pulap Island, FPO#3039
 Naval Base at Pakin Island, Senyavin IslandsFPO#3064
 Naval Base at Ant Island, in Senyavin Islands, FPO#3067
 Naval Base at Oroluk Atoll, FPO#3075, Oroluk Island had a lookout tower and Oroluk Lagoon for anchorage. 
 Naval Base at Ngulu Atoll, FPO#3079
 Naval Base at Namolus Island, FPO#3081
 Naval Base at Tonelik Island, FPO#3082, post war surrendered small base
 Naval Base at Woleai Island, FPO#3246, post war surrendered Woleai airfield.
 Naval Base at Hall Islands, FPO#3061, located to the north of Truk Lagoon.
Small Naval base to support Fais Airfield
Colonia Airfield post war surrendered a small base

American missions against Japan Carolines
From the US Naval Base Carolines the US had many missions against Japan bases in the Carolines. Japan's base at Truk, that the US Navy called The "Gibraltar of the Pacific'', was invasion bypassed in the island hoping Pacific war efforts. Truk had over 30,000 troops, seaport, five airstrips, a seaplane bases, a torpedo boat station, a submarine base and coastal artillery. Truk was attacked by air and had its supply lines cut off by sea, called Operation Hailstone.
Truk Atoll:
Param Airfield on Param Island in Truk Lagoon.
Eten Airfield on Eten Island in Truk Lagoon.
Megeson Airfield (Megeson) started in 1944 not completed.
Dublon Seaplane Base on Dublon Island and Truk Lagoon
Reef Islands base at Truk
Polle Island base at Truk
Eot Island base
Pata Island base
Fala-Beguets Island base
Yawata Island base (Yawata Shima)
Salat Island base
Northeast Island
Falo Island base
Udot Island base
Moen Island (Weno) in Truk Lagoon, two airfields and seaplane base:
Moen No. 1 Airfield now Chuuk International Airport the northwestern tip of Moen Island.
Moen No. 2 Airfield now part of Chuuk International Airport, located at the southwestern corner of Moen Island.
Moen Seaplane Base was at the southwestern corner of Moen Island.

Post war
 Pohnpei Airport built by a US Navy civil engineering team in 1972.

Gallery

See also

Operation Tan No. 2
US Naval Advance Bases

External links
 youtube.com Operation Hailstone
youtube.com Ulithi Atoll Anchorage Aerial Views of US Navy 5th Fleet at Anchor
 youtube.com 1940s World War II: Ulithi, Anchorage
youtube.com  US air operations at newly built airstrip on Ulithi Atoll in World War II HD Stock Footage

References

Naval Stations of the United States Navy
World War II airfields in the Pacific Ocean Theater
Airfields of the United States Navy
Military installations closed in the 1940s
Closed installations of the United States Navy